Maria Cristina Giai Pron (born 21 August 1974 in Turin) is an Italian slalom canoeist who competed at the international level from 1989 to 2010.

She won a bronze medal in the K1 event at the 2002 ICF Canoe Slalom World Championships in Bourg St.-Maurice. She also won a bronze medal in the K1 team event at the 1996 European Championships in Augsburg.

Giai Pron also competed in five Summer Olympics, earning her best finish of fourth in the K1 event in Atlanta in 1996.

Her younger sister Maria Clara represented Italy at the 2012 Summer Olympics in London.

World Cup individual podiums

References

1974 births
Canoeists at the 1992 Summer Olympics
Canoeists at the 1996 Summer Olympics
Canoeists at the 2000 Summer Olympics
Canoeists at the 2004 Summer Olympics
Canoeists at the 2008 Summer Olympics
Italian female canoeists
Living people
Olympic canoeists of Italy
Medalists at the ICF Canoe Slalom World Championships